The Linden Oak is a large white oak tree in North Bethesda, Maryland, beside the junction of Rockville Pike and Rock Creek Park's Beach Drive. In 1976, the Linden Oak was proclaimed a Maryland Bicentennial Tree because it stood its ground, survived the American Revolution, and continues to serve an appreciative nation." In 1978, a Maryland state agency estimated that it was seeded in 1718.

Significance
The origin of the name "Linden Oak" is unknown. It is ranked among the tallest white oak trees in the United States.

The impressiveness of the great tree diminished over time as it progressively lost its enormous and lowermost branches. One of the on-site plaques incorporates a photo of the tree in its former state. In 2021 the tree was in precipitous decline.  By spring of 2022 the tree had died at an estimated age of 303 years.  Local government and civics groups are in discussions with the park service about ways to honor the Linden Oak's place in the community history.

Plaques
The Linden Oak is acknowledged by three on-site plaques. 
The first plaque, placed in July 1976 by the Maryland Bicentennial Commission and the Maryland Forest Service, celebrates the "Maryland Bicentennial Tree" for its great age.
The second plaque, placed by the Montgomery County Department of Parks (also 1976) celebrates the "Linden Oak" as "the fourth largest of its species in the state of Maryland and the largest in Montgomery County".
The third plaque, placed by the Montgomery County Department of Park and Planning (no date), honors Idamae Garrott, a local politician and champion of the environment. Owing to her efforts in 1973, the adjacent stretch of the Washington Metro (Red Line) was built in an arc diverting around the tree to avoid disturbing it.

See also

 Wye Oak, a larger white oak in Wye Mills, Maryland that was destroyed by a windstorm in 2002.
Arbutus Oak, another white oak tree in Arbutus, Maryland that was saved during the construction of Interstate 95
List of individual trees

References

Individual oak trees
Individual trees in Maryland
Montgomery County, Maryland